The coat of arms of the city of Melbourne, also known as the armorial bearings, is the official symbol of the city of Melbourne, Australia. They were granted to the Corporation of the city by Letters Patent on 30 January 1940.

Blazon

Arms
On a silver shield, a red cross (the cross of St George) with a narrow red bar is adjacent and parallel with each side of the cross. On the central part of the cross is a Royal Crown.

And in the four-quarters, there are:

The top left corner (first quarter), there is a fleece hanging from a red ring.
The top right corner (second quarter), there is a black bull standing on a hillock.
The lower left corner (third quarter), there is a spouting whale swimming in the sea.
The lower right corner (fourth quarter), There is a three-masted ship in full-sail.
However, the crest as displayed on Princes Bridge Melbourne, has a different order for the same four quarters displayed above. Namely, the second and third quarters have been swapped. Moreover the fleece has been replaced with a white sheep. This crest is visible under lamps on the bridge.

Crest
Above the shield is the iron helmet with red and silver mantling and above the helmet there is the silver and red wreath, and on the wreath there is a gold mural crown, which is a symbol of municipal government. Out of the mural crown rises the upper half of a kangaroo, facing the left side of the shield and looking backwards over its shoulder.

Supporters
There is a gold lion on each side of the shield, upright on its hind legs and with a black crown. Around each lion's neck is a red collar on which there are two five-pointed silver stars. A red chain, attached at the top to the collar, passes over each lion's back and body.

Motto
A scroll below the arms reads 'Vires Acquirit Eundo' which translates as 'We gather strength as we go' (a quotation from Vergil's Aeneid, which in the original context refers to Fama, or Rumour personified).

See also

Flag of Melbourne
Coat of arms of Victoria
Australian heraldry

References
City of Melbourne Coat of Arms

Melbourne
History of Melbourne
City of Melbourne
Melbourne
Melbourne
Melbourne
Melbourne
Melbourne
Melbourne